

Competitions

Segunda División

League table

Matches

Copa del Rey

References

Racing de Santander seasons
Racing de Santander